Régis Dericquebourg (born 1947) is a French sociologist of religions.

He wrote his thesis on Jehovah's Witnesses under the direction of Jean Seguy. He holds a doctorate in psychosociology and a postgraduate degree in clinical psychology from the Institute of Paris 7. He is a member of the Group for the Study of Religions and Secularity at the National Center for the Scientific Studies in Paris, and a professor at the Charles de Gaulle University – Lille III. He published five books, many sociological articles in collective books, encyclopedias and journals and regularly participated in conferences of sociology. His contributions are mainly on Jehovah's Witnesses, healing in religion and new religious movements.

Healing-oriented religions
One of Dericquebourg's main contributions to the sociology of religions is the creation of a new category of religions, “religions de guérison” (healing-oriented religions). This category should avoid the debates about which movements are genuine religions and which are cults by focusing on healing as the main feature, and reason of success, for a number of religions very different between each other. In his 1988 book Les Religions de guérison, Dericquebourg proposed the category based on his analysis of Christian Science, Scientology, Antoinism and Invitation to Life, claiming that seeking healing is the main motivation for joining all these four groups.

Main works
 Les Religions de guérison, 1988, Paris : Cerf 
 Les Antoinistes, 1993, Paris-Turnhout : Brépols
 La Christian Science, 1999, Leumann, Torino: Elledici 
 Croire et guérir — Quatre religions de guérison, 2001, Paris : Dervy 
 Ces protestants qu’on dit Adventistes, with Fabrice Desplan, 2008, Paris : L'Harmattan 
 Georges Roux dit "le Christ de Montfavet". Ecologisme, ésotérisme et guérison, 2012, Bruxelles: E.M.E.

References

External links
  Official site
  Curriculum and list of publications by Dericquebourg, on the site of  the Observatoire Européen des religions et de la laïcité

1947 births
Living people
French sociologists
Sociologists of religion
Researchers of new religious movements and cults
French male writers